The Proposal is a 2022 Indian Malayalam-language musical and romantic comedy film written and directed by Joe Joseph, and produced by Silver Cloud Pictures. The film was released on 27 May 2022 as an OTT/Online Streaming on Saina Play. The story, set in Australia, revolves around a student visa holder Davis Mizpah (Joe Joseph) and his friend Archith Kumar Chandran Cherupalassery (Anumodh Paul). Davis happens to meet Sandra (Amara Raja) through a matrimonial website which leads to a turn in his life.

Plot 
Davis arrives in Canberra, Australia as a student visa holder, one year after his friend Archith Kumar. During the course of his student visa, he intentionally falls in love with Anjana to get a permanent resident visa in Australia. In early 2020, Anjana goes to her home in Kerala and gets stuck there due to pandemic. Knowing that she is not coming back to Australia, Davis, along with Archith attempts for an unusual smuggling in hopes to attain a lump sum amount of money before they leave Australia. When that plan hilariously fails, Mathews and Reena who see Davis and Archith as their own younger brothers, advice Davis to lead a happy and normal life by getting married. Davis ventures to matrimonial website with a demand - "no dowry asked but sponsor me with a permanent visa in Australia". When Davis meets Sandra, who is a very free-spirit independent woman with a dreadful-turned-strong background, his life takes a turn.

Cast 
 Joe Joseph as Davis Mizpah
 Amara Raja as Sandra
 Anumodh Paul as Archith Kumar Chandran Cherupalassery
 Clair Sara Martin as Anjana
 Suhas Pattathil as Mathews
 Karthika Menon Thomas as Reena
 Sana Subedi as Nisha

Production 
Silver Cloud Pictures had scheduled to start principal photography of the film in Ooty from early 2020 by the project got abandoned due to the pandemic. Joe Joseph, who was originally assigned to write the script and play the character of Archith Kumar Chandran Cherupalassery suggested a revised modern production strategy to shoot the film in Australia with an extremely low budget. However, the director who was supposed to direct the film expressed an inconvenience to travel to Australia and left the project. Joe Joseph stepped up to a director and lead actor role in order to complete the film and a new casting call was conducted to cast new comers to all the roles in the film.

Release 
The Proposal released as an OTT film on 27 May 2022 on Saina Play OTT.

Reception 
The proposal received generally positive response. Mathrubhumi News reviewed the film as a "colourful entertainer"... An online critic channel SAP Media Channel criticised the movie's length and semi amateur making of some scenes due to the low budget while keeping the overall review as a "decent entertainer".

Trivia 
In 1992, the filming of a Malayalam film titled "Australia" was commenced in Australia. Mohanlal was the lead actor and Shankar, Ramya Krishnan and Jagadish were in other main roles. The film was proposed to be directed by Rajiv Anchal. Due to some unknown reasons, the project was abandoned without completing the filming. The shots that they took during this project was used in the Malayalam film Butterflies. After this, Malayalam film industry had never shot a film in Australia

The Proposal is the first Malayalam feature film from Malayalam film industry to complete filming in Australia.

References

External links 
 

2022 films